Frederick Gordon Coles (17 November 1875 – 22 April 1947) was an English professional footballer who played as a wing half.

References

1875 births
1947 deaths
Footballers from Nottingham
English footballers
Association football wing halves
Notts County F.C. players
Nottingham Forest F.C. players
Arsenal F.C. players
Grimsby Town F.C. players
English Football League players
HVV Den Haag managers
English football managers